Mescul is a town in western Eritrea.

Location
The settlement is located in the Mogolo subregion of the Gash-Barka region.

Nearby towns and villages include Attai (5.7 nm), Aredda (6.1 nm), Hambok (6.3 nm), Dedda (6.3 nm), Tauda (8.2 nm) and Markaughe (8.3 nm).

Populated places in Eritrea